Édouard Désiré Maibaum (19 April 1883 – 16 October 1940) was a French cyclist. He competed in the sprint at the 1900 Summer Olympics.

References

External links

1883 births
1940 deaths
Cyclists from Paris
French male cyclists
Olympic cyclists of France
Cyclists at the 1900 Summer Olympics